Poisk, also known as the Mini-Research Module 2 (MRM 2), or МИМ 2, is a docking module of the International Space Station. Its original name was Docking Module 2 (SO-2), as it is almost identical to the Pirs Docking Compartment. Added in 2009, Poisk was the first major Russian addition to the International Space Station since 2001. Poisk is overall the same design as the docking module Pirs. Whereas Pirs was attached to the nadir ("bottom") port of Zvezda, Poisk is attached to the zenith ("top"); Pirs was closer to the Earth with the ISS in its usual orientation, and Poisk is on the other side. Poisk is Russian for explore or search. Poisk combines various docking, EVA, and science capabilities. It has two egress hatches for EVAs in addition to the two spacecraft docking ports. Although Poisk is designated as Mini-Research Module 2, it arrived before Mini-Research Module 1 (Rassvet), which had a different design; Poisk looks more like the Pirs docking port, which is not designated as a mini-research module.

Details

Poisk docked to the zenith port of the Zvezda module on November 12, 2009, and serves as a docking port for Soyuz and Progress spacecraft and as an airlock for spacewalks. Poisk will also provide extra space for scientific experiments, and provide power-supply outlets and data-transmission interfaces for two external scientific payloads to be developed by the Russian Academy of Sciences.

Two spacewalks conducted from the ISS in June 2009, successfully completed activities anticipating Poisk module's future berthing.

On 5 June 2009, during Russian Orlan EVA-22 spacewalk Expedition 19/20 Commander Gennady Padalka and Flight Engineer Michael Barratt installed two Kurs docking antennas, a docking target and electrical connectors on the exterior of Zvezdas Service Module.

On June 10, 2009, during Russian Orlan EVA-23 spacewalk Padalka and Barratt replaced a flat hatch cover in the forward section of Zvezda with a standard conical docking cone cover to allow for Poisks docking.

On January 14, 2010, cosmonauts Oleg Kotov and Maksim Suraev conducted a spacewalk to outfit the Poisk module to prepare for receiving Soyuz and Progress ships in the future. They deployed antennas and a docking target, installed two handrails and plugged the new module's Kurs antennas into the Kurs docking system circuitry. The spacewalk lasted five hours and 44 minutes.

On January 21, 2010, the module was first used when cosmonaut Suraev and Expedition 22 Commander Jeffrey Williams relocated their Soyuz TMA-16 spacecraft from the aft port of the Zvezda module to the zenith-facing port of the Poisk module. The Soyuz TMA-16 spacecraft undocked from the aft end of the Zvezda service module at 10:03 UTC and backed away to a distance of about 30m (100 feet) from the space station. Undocking occurred as the station flew about 343 km (213 miles) high off the southwest coast of Africa. Re-docking occurred at 10:24 UTC after Suraev fired the Soyuz maneuvering thrusters to fly halfway around the orbiting space station and line up with the Poisk module.

Since the EVA on November 18, 2020, Poisk has been used for EVAs instead of the decommissioned Pirs Docking Compartment. In future, it will be standard practice to dock Soyuz vehicles to the nadir ports of Rassvet and Prichal and dock Progresses to the aft port of Zvezda and the zenith port of Poisk. This is because the transfer chamber which connects to Zvezda’s aft port has a small leak which requires the hatches to remain closed as much as possible, which would block access to a Soyuz if it were docked to Zvezda's aft port. In addition, Progress crafts are preferred for Zvezda's aft port as this enables them to perform ISS reboosts using their main engines. Progresses are also preferred for the Poisk zenith port as Poisk is now serving as the Russian Segment's airlock following the departure of Pirs, and access to Soyuz craft docked to Poisk is blocked whilst Poisk is depressurized during spacewalks, which presents safety issues in an ISS evacuation scenario.

Design and construction
The module was designed and manufactured by S.P. Korolev RSC Energia, the organization engaged in the development and operational use of the ISS Russian segment.

Launch

The module was launched on November 10, 2009, 2:22 p.m. GMT attached to a modified Progress spacecraft, called Progress M-MIM2, on a Soyuz-U rocket from Launch Pad 1 at the Baikonur Cosmodrome in Kazakhstan. The occasion also marked the 1750th launch of a Soyuz rocket in its various configurations. About eight minutes after launch, the three-stage Soyuz rocket delivered Poisk, to a low-altitude injection orbit.

The Progress space tug provided electrical power and propulsion for the Poisk module during its two-day journey to the space station. On 12 November, Progress began its automated final approach to the station on a Kurs rendezvous radar system and at 15:41 UTC Poisk docked to the Zvezda module's zenith port. The docking happened as the space station sailed more than 354km (220 miles) over northern Kazakhstan.

Cosmonauts Maksim Suraev and Roman Romanenko entered the module for the first time by opening the hatch leading into Poisk at 12:17 UTC on 13 November 2009.

The jettisoning of the Progress ship from the Poisk module happened around 8 December 2009. The Progress was destroyed during re-entry into the atmosphere.

Specifications

False depressurization alarm
False alarms woke the crews aboard space shuttle Atlantis and the Space Station at 01:36 UTC on 20 November 2009 and once again at 02:53 UTC on 21 November. An erroneous indication of a rapid depressurization led to the automatic shutdown of ventilation fans throughout the station, which stirred up dust and led to a false smoke detection alarm in the European Space Agency's Columbus laboratory. Mission control Capcom Frank Lien in Houston told the Expedition 21 Commander Frank De Winne that it might have originated from the Poisk module.

Visiting spacecraft

Gallery (exterior)

Gallery (interior)

Diagram

See also

 Progress-M
 Rassvet (ISS module)
 Russian Orbital Segment
 Scientific research on the ISS

References

External links

Russian components of the International Space Station
Spacecraft launched in 2009
2009 in Russia